Long Beach station may refer to:
 Long Beach station (LIRR)
 Downtown Long Beach station, an at-grade light rail station in the Los Angeles County Metro Rail system
 Long Beach Boulevard station, a Los Angeles County Metro Rail freeway median station on the Green Line